Dorymyrmex grandulus, known as the great cone ant, is a species of ant in the genus Dorymyrmex. Described by Forel in 1922, the species is endemic to the United States.

References

Dorymyrmex
Hymenoptera of North America
Insects described in 1922